Howitzers are one of two primary types of field artillery.  Historically, howitzers fired a heavy shell in a high-trajectory from a relatively short barrel and their range was limited but they were slightly more mobile than similar size field guns. Since the end of World War II, howitzers have gained longer barrels and hence increased range to become gun-howitzers.

Towed howitzers

Self-propelled howitzers

Fixed howitzers

 
Howitzer